The Windimurra Igneous Complex is a giant ultramafic-mafic intrusion emplaced within the Yilgarn craton of Western Australia. It is located approximately 100 kilometres south east of the town of Mount Magnet.

Setting
The Windimurra Igneous Complex is part of the c. 2813 Ma Meeline Suite of mafic-ultramafic layered intrusions of the central Murchison Domain, Yilgarn Craton of Western Australia. It is a conical body, approximately 7 km thick, primarily composed of layered gabbroic rocks, which intrude into c. 2820 Ma Norie Group rocks of the Murchison Supergroup. The intrusion is approximately 85 x 37 km (2500 km2) in extent.

Lithology
Windimurra contains in excess of 13,000m of intact igneous stratigraphy formed of cumulate layering by a process of fractional crystallization. Individual rock types can be grouped into a troctolite phase or series, a gabbro phase or series and a gabbronorite phase or series. Anorthosite cumulates are preserved in the roof sections, most of which are sheared and faulted off. A marginal granophyre complex exists in the roof and wall rocks, formed by advective heat transfer causing melting of the country rocks.

Economic geology
The Windimurra Intrusion has been of great interest to mineral exploration companies for decades, as it is one of the thickest and largest ultramafic intrusions in the world, though it has been fragmented and mostly removed by shearing unlike the Bushveld Igneous Complex of South Africa.

Exploration has focused on finding basal nickel sulfide and chromitite deposits, although that has proved fruitless as the lower zone is not exposed. However, exploration for vanadium deposits related to oxide cumulate layers higher up in the intrusion has proved successful, with the opening of a major vanadium operation in the 1990s.

Vanadium
The Shepherd's Discordant Zone is host to a laterally extensive vanadiferous magnetite and ilmenite adcumulate and mesocumulate deposit, forming a resource in excess of 120 Mt grading 5% V2O5. The vanadium mineralisation is approximately 500 m thick and contains a basal 2m thick magnetite zone (containing >70% magnetite) and podiform, lenticular magnetite horizons above it, which is of principal economic interest.

In addition a few oxide-rich layers in the upper zone of the intrusion are ilmenite rich, although these appear not to be economic.

References

Geology of Western Australia
Economic geology
Ore deposits
Layered intrusions
Mesoarchean magmatism